Lebistinida pulchra is a species of beetle in the family Carabidae, the only species in the genus Lebistinida.

References

Lebiinae